The two hundred lei banknote is one of the circulating denomination of the Romanian leu.

The main color of the banknote is orange. It pictures, on the obverse a poet, Lucian Blaga, and on the reverse a watermill and a figurine known in Romania as the Hamangia Thinker.

History 

In the past, the denomination was also in the coin form, as follows:

First leu (1867-1947)
 coin issues: 1942, 1945

Second leu (1947-1952)
 no issues

Third leu - ROL (1952-2005)
 banknote issue: 1992

Fourth leu - RON (since 2005)
 banknote issue: 2006

References

External links

Banknotes of Romania
Two-hundred-base-unit banknotes